The Kotlas constituency (No.73) is a Russian legislative constituency in Arkhangelsk Oblast. In 1993-2007 the constituency covered upstate southern Arkhangelsk Oblast, however, in 2016 the constituency was changed: it took parts of Arkhangelsk and traded several districts in western Arkhangelsk Oblast with Arkhangelsk constituency for some territories in the north.

Members elected

Election results

1993

|-
! colspan=2 style="background-color:#E9E9E9;text-align:left;vertical-align:top;" |Candidate
! style="background-color:#E9E9E9;text-align:left;vertical-align:top;" |Party
! style="background-color:#E9E9E9;text-align:right;" |Votes
! style="background-color:#E9E9E9;text-align:right;" |%
|-
|style="background-color:"|
|align=left|Aleksandr Piskunov
|align=left|Independent
|
|40.89%
|-
| colspan="5" style="background-color:#E9E9E9;"|
|- style="font-weight:bold"
| colspan="3" style="text-align:left;" | Total
| 
| 100%
|-
| colspan="5" style="background-color:#E9E9E9;"|
|- style="font-weight:bold"
| colspan="4" |Source:
|
|}

1995

|-
! colspan=2 style="background-color:#E9E9E9;text-align:left;vertical-align:top;" |Candidate
! style="background-color:#E9E9E9;text-align:left;vertical-align:top;" |Party
! style="background-color:#E9E9E9;text-align:right;" |Votes
! style="background-color:#E9E9E9;text-align:right;" |%
|-
|style="background-color:"|
|align=left|Yury Guskov
|align=left|Communist Party
|
|19.36%
|-
|style="background-color:"|
|align=left|Vsevolod Bogdanov
|align=left|Independent
|
|13.74%
|-
|style="background-color:"|
|align=left|Vladimir Fedorov
|align=left|Independent
|
|10.77%
|-
|style="background-color:"|
|align=left|Yevgeny Ukhin
|align=left|Liberal Democratic Party
|
|9.85%
|-
|style="background-color:"|
|align=left|Sergey Gorshkov
|align=left|Independent
|
|6.85%
|-
|style="background-color:"|
|align=left|Sergey Kolotilov
|align=left|Agrarian Party
|
|6.74%
|-
|style="background-color:"|
|align=left|Vyacheslav Kalyamin
|align=left|Political Movement of Transport Workers
|
|6.04%
|-
|style="background-color:"|
|align=left|Vladimir Yenyagin
|align=left|Independent
|
|5.69%
|-
|style="background-color:"|
|align=left|Viktor Danichkin
|align=left|Independent
|
|4.48%
|-
|style="background-color:"|
|align=left|Valery Kabanov
|align=left|Independent
|
|2.72%
|-
|style="background-color:#000000"|
|colspan=2 |against all
|
|12.09%
|-
| colspan="5" style="background-color:#E9E9E9;"|
|- style="font-weight:bold"
| colspan="3" style="text-align:left;" | Total
| 
| 100%
|-
| colspan="5" style="background-color:#E9E9E9;"|
|- style="font-weight:bold"
| colspan="4" |Source:
|
|}

1999

|-
! colspan=2 style="background-color:#E9E9E9;text-align:left;vertical-align:top;" |Candidate
! style="background-color:#E9E9E9;text-align:left;vertical-align:top;" |Party
! style="background-color:#E9E9E9;text-align:right;" |Votes
! style="background-color:#E9E9E9;text-align:right;" |%
|-
|style="background-color:"|
|align=left|Vitaly Predybaylov
|align=left|Independent
|
|15.65%
|-
|style="background-color:"|
|align=left|Aleksandr Korygin
|align=left|Independent
|
|15.22%
|-
|style="background-color:"|
|align=left|Yury Guskov (incumbent)
|align=left|Communist Party
|
|11.58%
|-
|style="background-color:"|
|align=left|Vladimir Yenyagin
|align=left|Independent
|
|11.55%
|-
|style="background-color:#3B9EDF"|
|align=left|Vyacheslav Kalyamin
|align=left|Fatherland – All Russia
|
|11.03%
|-
|style="background-color:"|
|align=left|Aleksey Grishkov
|align=left|Yabloko
|
|7.14%
|-
|style="background-color:"|
|align=left|Tamara Gudima
|align=left|Independent
|
|5.95%
|-
|style="background-color:"|
|align=left|Valery Tarayko
|align=left|Independent
|
|3.17%
|-
|style="background-color:"|
|align=left|Aleksandr Beletsky
|align=left|Our Home – Russia
|
|1.71%
|-
|style="background-color:#000000"|
|colspan=2 |against all
|
|14.34%
|-
| colspan="5" style="background-color:#E9E9E9;"|
|- style="font-weight:bold"
| colspan="3" style="text-align:left;" | Total
| 
| 100%
|-
| colspan="5" style="background-color:#E9E9E9;"|
|- style="font-weight:bold"
| colspan="4" |Source:
|
|}

2003

|-
! colspan=2 style="background-color:#E9E9E9;text-align:left;vertical-align:top;" |Candidate
! style="background-color:#E9E9E9;text-align:left;vertical-align:top;" |Party
! style="background-color:#E9E9E9;text-align:right;" |Votes
! style="background-color:#E9E9E9;text-align:right;" |%
|-
|style="background-color:"|
|align=left|Valery Malchikhin
|align=left|United Russia
|
|34.75%
|-
|style="background-color:"|
|align=left|Andrey Smantser
|align=left|Independent
|
|16.00%
|-
|style="background-color: "|
|align=left|Vladimir Yenyagin
|align=left|Rodina
|
|10.87%
|-
|style="background-color:"|
|align=left|Viktor Zverev
|align=left|Independent
|
|10.32%
|-
|style="background-color:"|
|align=left|Yevgeny Guryev
|align=left|Communist Party
|
|5.95%
|-
|style="background-color:#164C8C"|
|align=left|Galina Likhanova
|align=left|United Russian Party Rus'
|
|5.10%
|-
|style="background-color:#FFD700"|
|align=left|Aleksandr Korygin
|align=left|People's Party
|
|3.41%
|-
|style="background-color:#000000"|
|colspan=2 |against all
|
|12.28%
|-
| colspan="5" style="background-color:#E9E9E9;"|
|- style="font-weight:bold"
| colspan="3" style="text-align:left;" | Total
| 
| 100%
|-
| colspan="5" style="background-color:#E9E9E9;"|
|- style="font-weight:bold"
| colspan="4" |Source:
|
|}

2016

|-
! colspan=2 style="background-color:#E9E9E9;text-align:left;vertical-align:top;" |Candidate
! style="background-color:#E9E9E9;text-align:left;vertical-align:top;" |Party
! style="background-color:#E9E9E9;text-align:right;" |Votes
! style="background-color:#E9E9E9;text-align:right;" |%
|-
|style="background-color: " |
|align=left|Andrey Palkin
|align=left|United Russia
|
|43.25%
|-
|style="background-color:"|
|align=left|Irina Chirkova
|align=left|A Just Russia
|
|22.84%
|-
|style="background-color:"|
|align=left|Igor Arsentyev
|align=left|Liberal Democratic Party
|
|11.87%
|-
|style="background-color:"|
|align=left|Vasily Pavlov
|align=left|Communist Party
|
|10.57%
|-
|style="background-color: " |
|align=left|Yury Chesnokov
|align=left|Yabloko
|
|2.99%
|-
|style="background-color: "|
|align=left|Aleksey Guryev
|align=left|Rodina
|
|2.59%
|-
|style="background:"| 
|align=left|Roman Fedulov
|align=left|Communists of Russia
|
|1.54%
|-
|style="background-color:"|
|align=left|Andrey Zhadchenko
|align=left|Patriots of Russia
|
|1.02%
|-
| colspan="5" style="background-color:#E9E9E9;"|
|- style="font-weight:bold"
| colspan="3" style="text-align:left;" | Total
| 
| 100%
|-
| colspan="5" style="background-color:#E9E9E9;"|
|- style="font-weight:bold"
| colspan="4" |Source:
|
|}

2021

|-
! colspan=2 style="background-color:#E9E9E9;text-align:left;vertical-align:top;" |Candidate
! style="background-color:#E9E9E9;text-align:left;vertical-align:top;" |Party
! style="background-color:#E9E9E9;text-align:right;" |Votes
! style="background-color:#E9E9E9;text-align:right;" |%
|-
|style="background-color: " |
|align=left|Elena Vtorygina
|align=left|United Russia
|
|29.40%
|-
|style="background-color:"|
|align=left|Irina Chirkova
|align=left|A Just Russia — For Truth
|
|19.42%
|-
|style="background-color:"|
|align=left|Aleksandr Grevtsov
|align=left|Communist Party
|
|13.22%
|-
|style="background-color: " |
|align=left|Roman Novikov
|align=left|New People
|
|8.36%
|-
|style="background-color:"|
|align=left|Yekaterina Alekhintseva
|align=left|Liberal Democratic Party
|
|8.01%
|-
|style="background-color: " |
|align=left|Aleksandr Kozenkov
|align=left|Yabloko
|
|7.45%
|-
|style="background-color: "|
|align=left|Sergey Orekhanov
|align=left|Party of Pensioners
|
|3.64%
|-
|style="background-color: "|
|align=left|Oleg Mishukov
|align=left|Rodina
|
|2.55%
|-
|style="background:"| 
|align=left|Oksana Kopteva
|align=left|Russian Party of Freedom and Justice
|
|2.14%
|-
|style="background-color:"|
|align=left|Ayman Tyukina
|align=left|The Greens
|
|1.83%
|-
| colspan="5" style="background-color:#E9E9E9;"|
|- style="font-weight:bold"
| colspan="3" style="text-align:left;" | Total
| 
| 100%
|-
| colspan="5" style="background-color:#E9E9E9;"|
|- style="font-weight:bold"
| colspan="4" |Source:
|
|}

Notes

References

Russian legislative constituencies
Politics of Arkhangelsk Oblast